The Massive-Verse (M-V) is a fictional shared universe, created by Kyle Higgins as an offshoot/relaunch of the Image Universe (IU), which spans a line of comic books (Radiant Black and its spin-offs) published by Image Comics since February 2021, later retroactively established to have begun with C.O.W.L., first published in May 2014.

Publication history 
In November 2020, it was announced that Higgins was writing another creator-owned book for Image Comics entitled Radiant Black, with art by Marcelo Costa. The series officially began publication in February 2021. The series would grow so popular, that it would expand into its own universe of books dubbed "The Massive-Verse", serving to relaunch the Image Universe (IU). It all started with a one-shot crossover entitled Supermassive, written by Higgins, Ryan Parrott, and Mat Groom with art by Francesco Manna and Simone Ragazzoni. The comic served as a backdoor pilot for spin-off titles entitled Inferno Girl Red and Rogue Sun, the comic marking the first appearances of the series' protagonists. The first of these new books to spawn out of this would be the title Rogue Sun written by Parrott and illustrated by Abel, with its first issue releasing on March 2, 2022 and Inferno Girl Red set to debut in January 2023, written by Groom and illustrated by Erica D'Urso. In February 2022, it was announced that another book connected to the Massive-Verse would release in August entitled The Dead Lucky, written by Melissa Flores and illustrated by French Carlomango. The first direct spin-off of Radiant Black would release on March 9, 2022, entitled Radiant Red, with the miniseries written by Cherish Chen and art by David Lafuente. Another spin-off, Radiant Pink, written by Meghan Camarena and Melissa Flores and illustrated by Emma Kubert, will debut on December 7, 2022. C.O.W.L., was originally released in 2014 but has since been retroactively designated as part of the Massive-Verse. In December 2022, it was announced that a new series, entitled No/One, would launch in March 2023, with Higgins and Brian Buccellato writing and Geraldo Borges illustrating. A second Supermassive event will launch in May 2023.

Characters
 Radiant Black (Nathan Burnett) — The original Radiant Black, before a building collapsed on top of him that left him in a coma for 9 months. He eventually became Radiant Black again and is now sharing the Radiant with Marshall. Has the ability to manipulate gravity and shoot energy blasts. 
 Radiant Black (Marshall) — Nathan's best friend and the second Radiant Black after Nathan fell into a coma. Has the ability to manipulate gravity and shoot energy blasts. 
 Radiant Red (Satomi Sone) — An Asian-American woman with financial debt. Has the ability of matter-absorption
 Rogue Sun (Dylan Siegel) — The latest Rogue Sun following the death of his estranged father, Marcus Bell.
 Inferno Girl Red (Cassia Costa) — A teenage girl living in Apex City and the current Inferno Girl Red
 Radiant Pink (Eva) — A hispanic internet streamer who has the ability to open portals
 Radiant Yellow (Wendell George) — An elderly African-American man who has the ability to see every probability across time and space
 Bibiana "Bibi" Lopez-Yang — The former captain of the platoon "Dead Lucky" and has the ability to control electrical machinery and can see energy ghosts.
 No/One — A vigilante operating in Pittsburgh following the Richard Roe murders.
 Shift (Guy) — a recurring villain who antagonizes Radiant Black and leads his own crime syndicate. Has the ability to "shift" between places.

Titles

Ongoing and limited series

One-shots

Other

Other media

Animated short film 
In June 2022, to tie in with the release of Radiant Black #15, an animated short produced by Tiger Animation and Black Market Narrative entitled Versus | Radiant Black vs. Blaze was released, with Higgins directing and co-writing with Alec Siegel and Will Friedle providing the voice of Radiant Black. The short can be viewed on the official Black Market Narrative YouTube channel.

Podcast 
In December 2022, it was announced that, to tie-in with the release of No/One, an in-universe podcast entitled Who Is No/One? will release with each issue and will feature the voice work of Rachael Leigh Cook as Julia Paige, the host of the podcast, and Patton Oswalt as Teddy Barstow, the Metro Editor for The Pittsburgh Ledger. Loren Lester provides the voice of No/One, while Yuri Lowenthal, Tara Platt, Cristina Vee and Karl Herlinger are also cast. The podcast will also feature original art by Mark Englert and music by Kristopher Carter.

Release order
Year One

 Radiant Black #1
 Radiant Black #2
 Radiant Black #3
 Radiant Black #4
 Radiant Black #5
 Radiant Black #6
 Radiant Black #7
 Radiant Black #8
 Radiant Black #9
 Radiant Black #10
 Radiant Black #11
 Radiant Black #12
 Supermassive #1

Year Two

Rogue Sun #1
 Radiant Red #1
 Radiant Black #13
 Rogue Sun #2
 Radiant Red #2
 Image! #1
 Rogue Sun #3
 Radiant Black #14
 Radiant Red #3
 Rogue Sun #4
 Image! #2
 Radiant Black #15
 Rogue Sun #5
 Radiant Red #4
 Image! #3
 Radiant Black #16
 Rogue Sun #6
 Radiant Red #5
 Image! #4
 The Dead Lucky #1
 Radiant Black #17
 The Dead Lucky #2
 Radiant Black #18
 Rogue Sun #7
 The Dead Lucky #3
 Radiant Black #19
 The Dead Lucky #4
 Rogue Sun #8
 Radiant Pink #1
 Radiant Black #20
 Rogue Sun #9
 Radiant Pink #2
 The Dead Lucky #5
 Inferno Girl Red #1
 Radiant Black #21
 Rogue Sun #10
 The Dead Lucky #6
 Inferno Girl Red #2
 Radiant Pink #3
 Radiant Black #22
 Rogue Sun #11
 No/One #1

Reading order

 Radiant Black #1–9
 Radiant Red #1–5
 Shift in Image! #1–4
 Radiant Black #10–12
 Supermassive (2022) #1
 Radiant Black #13–18
 Radiant Black #19–24
 Radiant Pink #1–5
 Supermassive (2023) #1

Collected editions

References

External links 

 Official Website

2014 in comics